UMhlobo Wenene FM (UWFM) is a South African radio station, providing news, sports, and entertainment broadcasts in isiXhosa. The station broadcasts 24/7 on Channel 818 on DStv. It is the second-largest radio station in South Africa, with 4 million listeners.

Broadcasting began on May 6, 1960, from the city of Port Elizabeth (now Gqeberha), under the name Radio Xhosa, before a renaming following the fall of apartheid and the 1994 election.

The station has a broadcasting license from ICASA (Independent Communications Authority of South Africa).

The station has received a number of awards.

References

External links
 Website in Xhosa and English
  
 

Radio stations in South Africa
Radio stations established in 1960
Port Elizabeth
Xhosa language
Mass media in the Eastern Cape